Eddie Landsberg (born October 2, 1971) is a jazz organist.

His first CD, Remembering Eddie Jefferson, featured bebop vocalist Giacomo Gates and James Spaulding.

References

External links
Official site
Eddie's Lounge Official Website (located in Nishi-Nippori, Arakawa-ku, Tokyo, Japan)
Eddie Landsberg's Youtube profile

1971 births
Living people
American jazz organists
American male organists
Musicians from Philadelphia
Jazz musicians from Pennsylvania
21st-century organists
21st-century American male musicians
American male jazz musicians
21st-century American keyboardists